Mian Kuh (also Romanized as Mīān Kūh) is a village in Tula Rud Rural District, in the Central District of Talesh County, Gilan Province, Iran. At the 2006 census, its population was 603, in 137 families.

References 

Populated places in Talesh County